WCLC-FM (branded as New Life 105) is a Southern gospel formatted broadcast radio station licensed to Jamestown, Tennessee, serving Jamestown and the vicinity. WCLC-FM is owned and operated by New Life Studios, Inc. and features most of the programming from the Moody Broadcasting Network. It simulcast on its daytimer sister station WCLC, until WCLC's license was cancelled on August 24, 2021.

History
WCLC-FM began their broadcasting activities in the summer of 1985 and has since then maintained its gospel format.

External links
NewLife 105 - Official Website

CLC-FM
Southern Gospel radio stations in the United States